Brylkinia is a genus of East Asian plants in the grass family. The only known species is Brylkinia caudata, native to Japan, China (Sichuan, Jilin), and Russia (Kuril, Sakhalin).

See also
 List of Poaceae genera

References

Pooideae
Grasses of Asia
Grasses of China
Flora of Eastern Asia
Flora of the Russian Far East
Monotypic Poaceae genera